Disabled People Against Cuts (DPAC) is an organisation based in the United Kingdom for disabled people and allies to campaign against the impact of government spending cuts on the lives of disabled people.  Formed on 3 October 2010 DPAC promotes full human rights and equality for all disabled people, and operates from the Social Model of Disability.

History 

The 'Disabled People Protest' demonstration took place outside the Conservative Party annual conference on 3 October 2010 in the pouring rain in Birmingham, England. This was the first mass protest against the impact of austerity cuts to disabled people. It was also entirely led by disabled people, speaking out on their own behalf for themselves.  Using this march as a catalyst, leading activists founded the organisation.

Structure 

DPAC is a non-hierarchical organisation which grew organically from a small group of people who came together to plan an anti-cuts march in Birmingham. The current steering group was elected at the 2011 conference.

There are 26 local DPAC groups, each one of which works within the DPAC constitution but are generally autonomous and their members make decisions for those groups.

DPAC currently has a formal membership of 1,500, with 2,500 members of the Facebook page and 4,500 followers on Twitter. Online activism has had a key role to play in the development of the group. While other groups were organising entirely on line, or alternatively making little use of new social media, DPAC developed an approach that enabled both approaches side by side which enabled greater numbers to take part.

Affiliations 

DPAC is closely affiliated with its sister organisation Black Triangle in Scotland.

Philosophy 

DPAC operate from the Social model of disability which sees disability as being created by the structures of society not the medical differences in a persons body. A very simple example of this is where a wheelchair user won't say that they can not get up the steps into the public building because they have a specific medical condition that prevents them from walking, rather, they are disabled by the lack of access ramps. Economic, political and cultural forces exclude those of us with impairments and long-term health conditions from full participation in society, limiting our educational, social, political, economic, health and cultural potential, well-being and participation. DPAC supports full citizenship for all Disabled People and opposes all cutbacks and austerity measures which are currently hitting Disabled People 9 times harder than non-disabled people.

Issues 

DPAC oppose all austerity measures which are currently heavily impacting disabled people in the UK. These include the closure of the Independent Living Fund, Personal Independence Payment (replacing Disability Living Allowance), Employment and Support Allowance, the Children and Families Bill 2013 and the 'Bedroom tax'.

Campaigns and actions 

Ellen Clifford, of DPAC, explained the tactics used by the anti-cuts group in the Guardian, saying "No one who cares about social justice can work with a government that is intent on dismantling the welfare state, so disabled activists are having to find other means to try to stop what is happening. Legal challenges to reforms are one part of that... But legal challenges aren't an answer in themselves, and, as a form of campaigning, need to be run alongside other forms of awareness-raising, lobbying, protests and direct action. We need the 99% to stand up and say "We will not let this happen'"."

 Civil disobedience actions 

DPAC have carried out a number of civil disobedience actions. The most notable of these actions follow. A blockade of Regent Street in London, January 2012, with UK Uncut.
Blockade of Trafalgar Square in April 2012
A street blockade as part of a national Trade Union march in October 2012
April 2013 The 'Eviction' of Iain Duncan Smith
August 2013 DPAC members took part in the 'Reclaim the Power' anti-fracking protest camp at Balcombe, West Sussex to engage with training in non-violent Direct action, and emphasise the needs of disabled people for clean, affordable and sustainable energy. On 24 June 2015, activists angered by the ending of The Independent Living Fund for disabled people were prevented from accessing The House of Commons Chamber during PMQs. Members of Manchester DPAC chained their wheelchairs together to block the VIP entrance to the Conservative Party Conference in October 2015. In September 2016, DPAC protesters closed down Westminster Bridge for several hours to bring attention to deaths arising from government welfare 'reforms'. In July 2017, the Lobby of Parliament was occupied and the main entrance to the Commons Chamber blocked, accompanied by chants of "No Justice...No Peace".

 Week of Action 

In 2012, 2013, 2016, and 2017 have held a 'Week of Action' to highlight the impact of austerity and the cuts on disabled peoples lives.The Atos GamesFrom Monday 27 August 2012 DPAC hosted a week of 'The Atos Games' which focused on highlighting the hypocrisy of the sponsorship of the Paralympic games by Atos – the same company that carries out the highly controversial Work Capability Assessments. Events included a spoof 'paralymic award ceremony', and the delivery of a coffin to Atos offices. On 30 August, campaigners staging a "die in" in Cardiff brought traffic to a standstill. On the closing day of the event, a demonstration outside Atos head offices moved to the offices of the Department of Work and Pensions (DWP) where protestors chained themselves to the main entrance. This event was marred with significant police violence.Reclaiming our Futures''' was the week of action held from 29 August to 4 September 2013 to protest against the targeting of disabled people by austerity measures, and to celebrate the value, pride and self-determination of disabled people. The event features an on-line day of action launch, coinciding with the Torch Relay protest organised by Transport for All to highlight lack of accessibility on the new crossrail trainline currently being constructed. Friday 30 August saw local protests across the UK, while Saturday 1 September features a day of art and music with a 'Disability, Art and Protest' exhibition, banner making workshop, poetry reading and gig. 'The Social Model in the 21st century' conference saw key note speeches by Debbie Jolly of DPAC, Professor Colin Barnes and Ann Rae of the Union of the Physically Impaired Against Segregation (UPIAS). The week included a direct action outside the BBC to highlight biased representation of disabled people and promotion of 'scrounger rhetoric' and culminated on a march on parliament during which the UK Disabled Peoples Manifesto was launched.

The 2016 Week Of Action was held to coincide with the Paralympic Games in London in September. Events included a pop-up guerilla art installation at Tate Modern, London, and the closing of Westminster Bridge by activists.

The 2017 Week of Action, in August, included support for RMT action to keep guards on trains, a protest outside ATOS HQ, and the blocking of the main entrance to The House of Commons Chamber.

On the Record 

In 2019, DPAC activists in Manchester and Sheffield started a campaign to have PIP assessments audio recorded, in response to reports of assessment companies recording inaccurate information during assessments and producing flawed decisions. Because the Department for Work and Pensions only allowed audio recording of assessments via CD and audio cassette, the campaign raised funds to purchase the necessary audio recording equipment so that it could be loaned out for free to people facing PIP assessments. Activists stressed that while the initiative aimed to ensure greater accountability and fairness in the current process, the ultimate aim of the campaign remained to scrap work capability and PIP assessments altogether. The campaign was supported by Labour MPs including Dan Carden and Emma Hardy.

In 2020, The DWP committed to a new approach to "provide consistency for claimants across audio recording of work capability assessments and personal independence payment assessments". On 30 September 2020, the DWP Secretary told the Work and Pensions Committee that assessors had begun audio recording assessments.

See also
 Anti-austerity movement in the United Kingdom
 Disability rights movement
 National Campaign Against Fees and Cuts
 UK Uncut

References

External links
 

2010 establishments in the United Kingdom
Disability rights organizations
Disability organisations based in the United Kingdom
Political advocacy groups in the United Kingdom
Civil disobedience